Lister was a Norwegian newspaper, published in Farsund in Vest-Agder county.

Lister was started in 1878. It stopped in 1881, but returned in 1883. Lister finally went defunct in 1934.

References

1878 establishments in Norway
1934 disestablishments in Norway
Defunct newspapers published in Norway
Norwegian-language newspapers
Publications established in 1878
Publications disestablished in 1934
Mass media in Vest-Agder